Marks to Prove It is the fourth and final studio album released by the English band The Maccabees released on 31 July 2015 through Fiction Records. Upon release, it reached number one in the UK Album chart. In North America a digital version was made available through Communion Records with a physical release to follow at a later date.

The album was recorded in the band's studio in Elephant and Castle and pays tribute to the area, including the album cover being of the Michael Faraday Memorial that is near the studio.

Accolades

Track listing 
All tracks are written by The Maccabees.

Personnel
Credits adapted from Tidal.

The Maccabees
 Orlando Weeks – vocals , backing vocals , guitar , organ , kazoo 
 Felix White – guitar , backing vocals , piano 
 Hugo White – guitar , organ , piano , vocals , backing vocals 
 Rupert Jarvis – bass guitar 
 Sam Doyle - drums , percussion 

Technical
 Felix White – production 
 Hugo White – production 
 Laurie Latham – production 
 Orlando Weeks – production 
 Rupert Jarvis – production 
 Sam Doyle – production 
 Joe McCann - assistant recording engineer , assistant mixer 
 Sean Juilliard - assistant recording engineer , assistant mixer 
 Bob Ludwig - mastering engineer 
 Cenzo Townshend - mixer 
 Jag Jago - recording engineer 
 Tom Stanley - recording engineer 
 Iain Harvie - string arranger 

Additional musicians
 Laurie Latham - percussion 
 Polly Louise Mackey - backing vocals 
 Rebekah Raa - piano , backing vocals 
 Fabiana Palladino - piano 
 Kenji Fenton - saxophone 
 Mike Davis - trumpet 
 Sam White - backing vocals 
 Stephanie Oyerinde - backing vocals 
 Geraint Watkins - piano 
 Paul Burton - trombone 

Artwork
 David Busfield – cover photo
 Go De Jong – design
 Andy Goldsworthy – photography
 James Caddick – photography
 James Cronin – photography
 Pooneh Ghana - portrait photography
 Sam Doyle - portrait photography

References

2015 albums
The Maccabees (band) albums
Albums produced by Laurie Latham